The Xingu corydoras (Corydoras xinguensis) is a tropical freshwater fish belonging to the subfamily Corydoradinae of the family Callichthyidae.  It originates in inland waters in South America, and is found in the upper Xingu River basin in Brazil.  It is named for the river in which it is found.  In the system of "C-Numbers" developed by the German fishkeeping magazine DATZ to identify undescribed species of Corydoras in the aquarium hobby, this fish had been assigned numbers "C55", "C105", "C106", "C107", and "C108" until these were correctly identified.

The fish will grow in length up to 1.5 inches (3.7 centimeters).  It lives in a tropical climate in water with a 6.0–8.0 pH, a water hardness of 2–25 dGH, and a temperature range of 72–79 °F (22–26 °C).  It feeds on worms, benthic crustaceans, insects, and plant matter.  It lays eggs in dense vegetation and adults do not guard the eggs.

The Xingu corydoras is of commercial importance in the aquarium trade industry.

As they mature they develop a pinkish tinge to their main body colouration which is broken by brown speckles.

See also
List of freshwater aquarium fish species

References 

Corydoras
Taxa named by Han Nijssen
Fish described in 1972